Uatu, often simply known as the Watcher, is a fictional character appearing in American comic books published by Marvel Comics. Created by Stan Lee and Jack Kirby, he first appeared in The Fantastic Four #13 (April 1963). He is a member of the Watchers, an extraterrestrial species who in the distant past stationed themselves across space to monitor the activities of other species. Uatu is the Watcher assigned to observe Earth and its Solar System.

The character has been adapted into other media, such as video games, toys, and television. Jeffrey Wright voices the Watcher, a character based on Uatu, in the Marvel Cinematic Universe animated series What If..? (2021–present) on Disney+.

Publication history
The character first appeared without a name in Fantastic Four #13 (Apr 1963), and periodically reappeared in that title. He then starred in "Tales of the Watcher", a backup feature that ran in Tales of Suspense #49-58 (Jan 1964-Oct 1965), Silver Surfer #1-7 (Aug 1968-Aug 1969) and Marvel Super-Heroes #23 (Nov 1969). His origin was revealed in Tales of Suspense #52-53 (Apr-May 1964), and his name was revealed in Captain Marvel #39 (Jul 1975).

The character has made many cameo appearances across the Marvel Universe since his debut, including Avengers, Uncanny X-Men, Hulk, Silver Surfer, Quasar, and Marvel Point One. He acts as the narrator in Marvel's What If? title.

In the 2014 "Original Sin" storyline, the character is murdered, sparking a hunt for his murderer. The core miniseries of that storyline is written by Jason Aaron and illustrated by Mike Deodato.

Fictional character biography
The Watchers are among the oldest and most advanced beings in the cosmos. Eons ago, they sought to spread their knowledge to benefit the lesser races of the Universe. Their first attempt, on the planet Prosilicus, included sharing nuclear technology. When the Watchers returned to Prosilicus, they found the natives had all but destroyed themselves in a nuclear war. The Watchers blamed themselves for the catastrophe and vowed to never again meddle in the affairs of other races. Instead, they passively observe and record events for those who will come after the universe ends.

Uatu is the Watcher assigned to watch over Earth from his home in the Blue Area of the Moon. He is an altruist and has bent or violated his oath on numerous occasions to aid humanity. He revealed himself to the Fantastic Four when they discovered his home, telling them he would leave the Moon to observe humanity from a more distant area. He proceeded to violate his oath several more times to aid the Fantastic Four. His most notable transgression was in Fantastic Four #48, in which he tried, and failed, to prevent the Silver Surfer from bringing the planet-devourer Galactus to the Earth. For his continuous disregard for the Watchers' mission, Uatu is once placed on trial by the Watchers. He is found guilty, but is released on his own recognizance.

When the Shi'ar seek to prosecute Mister Fantastic for saving Galactus' life, Uatu serves as his lawyer and receives help from Odin, Eternity, and even Galactus himself to explain that Galactus is part of the universe's balance. Uatu is removed from his duty as Watcher of the Earth, but he returns to observe the world of which he has become so fond. During the GLX-Mas Special, Uatu appears in Wisconsin, after Squirrel Girl and her sidekick Monkey Joe defeat Thanos. He confirms that the Thanos she defeated was real, not a clone or copy. Uatu is present when the Dreaming Celestial awakens, but he turns away, unwilling to watch. After scanning him, the Dreaming Celestial reveals Uatu has broken his pact of non-interference almost 400 times.

Uatu later arrived in Death Valley to watch the battle between Hulk and Red Hulk only to be ambushed and knocked out by Red Hulk. Upon sensing the Red Hole of Dargala about to make a new Omegex, Uatu saw to it that its next target was Red Hulk in hopes that Red Hulk would be able to defeat it. Since these events, Uatu has restricted himself to appearing to observe particularly cosmic events in the Marvel Universe, such as visiting the heroes prior to the vote on the Superhuman Registration Act, the final battle of the "Secret Invasion" storyline, and the Hood's acquisition of the Infinity Gems, reflecting during these appearances that he cannot do any more or he may be taken from Earth altogether.

Uatu later visited Red Hulk at the time when he was on an asteroid helping Thor to close a black hole. He does tell Red Hulk of his impending doom, but cannot describe it due to the Watchers' vow to not interfere. Uatu then watched Red Hulk fail at jumping across other asteroids until he was rescued by Thor. Uatu temporarily abandoned his post to travel to the Red Hole of Dargala. His absence was noticed by the other Watchers who sent the Watcher Uravo to find him. After being unable to find him, Uravo informed Yruku and the other Watchers that he thinks Uatu has become unhinged ever since Red Hulk attacked and absorbed some of his powers. When Uravo finally caught up to Uatu at the Red Hole of Dargala, Uatu tells Uravo that they should not have come together. They witnessed Omegex emerge from the Red Hole of Dargala as it heads towards Earth to target Red Hulk. Uatu and Uravo later tracked Omegex's trail as it gets closer to Earth.

During the "Fear Itself" storyline, Uatu appeared next to Odin as Thor assists the Avengers. Aware that Uatu is there to witness the rise of the Serpent's daughter Skadi, Odin called Uatu a "titanic mute baby too dumb to be of use." Uatu later left while Odin kept boasting about himself. Uatu later watched Red Hulk's fight with Omegex. Noticing Uatu, Red Hulk shouts to him that he finally got his closure. Upon Red Hulk regressing back to Thunderbolt Ross, Uatu watches as Omegex ceased to exist upon it being unable to find Red Hulk. Iron Man later encountered Uatu upon his return from space as Uatu shows him the corpse of the Living Tribunal on the Moon. Hoping to procreate, Uatu began seeing the Watcher Ulana who moved in with him. After an unrevealed amount of time, Ulana became pregnant.

Original Sin and death
The 2014 "Original Sin" storyline reveals that Uatu's father was the Watcher who originally gave nuclear technology to the Prosilicans, and that Uatu's observation of parallel universes is motivated by a desire to find the one world where his father's act of charity was proved to be the right thing to do. In the beginning of the story, Uatu is murdered, and his eyes are gouged out, setting off a search by the Avengers and their allies for his killer. It is discovered that Uatu was killed by giant gamma-irradiated bullets, as were a number of varying giant monsters discovered by the Avengers' investigation in outer space, beneath the Earth's surface, and in other dimensions. Nick Fury eventually reveals that he has spent decades in a secret one-man mission to single-handedly confront and kill alien, subterranean, and extradimensional beings that threaten the Earth, and that, with the Infinity Formula having been depleted from his body, he has experienced rapid aging and wishes one of the superhuman investigators who have confronted him to take his place before his imminent death. It is shown in flashback that, weeks before Uatu's death, he came to witness Fury as his Infinity Formula began to fail, with subsequent flashbacks revealing that the Orb, Dr. Midas, and the Exterminatrix attacked Uatu and took one of his eyes, although Uatu survived the injury he received from Orb. Fury arrived soon after to talk to Uatu, but Uatu refused to identify his attacker and share the location of his missing eye due to it risking his oath. As Uatu began to gather his power for an apparent attack, Fury kills him, taking the other eye as he realizes that Uatu "records" everything he watches in his eyes. Following a fight with Orb that blew up Uatu's house, Fury subsequently inherits Uatu's power and position after using the power of one of Uatu's eyes to kill Doctor Midas and becomes known as "The Unseen", chained and watching events unfold on Earth, while the Orb merges with Uatu's other eye, which appears on his chest. From a distance, a teary-eyed Ulana said goodbye to Uatu even though his body has not been found.

Revival
In the aftermath of the "Empyre" storyline, the Unseen uses his powers to bring the Cotati's weapons to him so that he could learn how a pacifistic race like the Cotati had gained them. Once he began analyzing them, the Unseen realizes the weapons were created by the First Race and is overcome with energy as the one-eyed Uatu is brought back to life. When the Unseen asks how he is back from the dead and to at least say something, all Uatu says is "There shall be...a reckoning."

While reconstructing his home, Uatu learns of how Nick Fury became Unseen by tapping into the Cyclopedia Universum. It revealed that three of Uatu's brothers and sisters broke their non-interference vow by judging Nick Fury and fusing what's left of Uatu with Nick Fury. After viewing some of the good things that Unseen did and the weapons used by the Cotati which caused Uatu to be revived, he states that the technology did not belong to the Cotati. While he cannot commute Nick Fury's sentence, he does release him from his punishment by removing the chains on him since he needs an operative to get the job done and makes Nick Fury his herald. The first war is coming and Uatu states that everything and everyone is in peril as Nick Fury accepts his offer to aid him.

During the "Reckoning War" storyline, Uatu attempts to appeal to the other Watchers for help, but they reject his warnings, to the extent that his father forces Uatu to watch what he describes as the "What If" scenario he has never looked at himself; "What If Uatu Had Never Interfered?" Watching a world where he never alerted the FF to the coming of Galactus, Uatu sees the team suffer various injuries in battle with Galactus, including Sue being blinded, Johnny burning himself trying to knock out the Surfer, and Ben taking a serious beating. However, although he suffers damage from exposure to the energies in Galactus's ship, Reed is able to analyze the energy Galactus feeds on and devise a weapon that unleashes a form of energy dangerous to Galactus, destroying Galactus and freeing the Surfer, Reed subsequently adapting that energy into a new power source for Earth. Uatu is horrified at this apparent proof that he broke his vow for nothing, and his father than leaves him to watch this alternate universe for the rest of his existence as punishment for his interference, while the rest of the Watchers remain resolved not to get involved in the coming war (unaware that Nick Fury is watching them and plans to take action himself). Fury is later able to release Uatu from the chair after showing him that the vision was incomplete, that timeline concluding with Reed's new energy generator overloading and erasing the universe, leaving Uatu shaken but assured that his interference was right after all.

Powers and abilities
As a member of the race of Watchers, Uatu possesses vast psionic abilities which have been further developed through training. These abilities include flight, telepathy, energy-manipulation powers, power-negating force-field projection, illusion casting, the ability to psionically alter his appearance at will, and highly advanced cosmic senses allowing him to be aware of countless events of Earth. His superhumanly complex intelligence enables him to monitor activities throughout Earth's solar system simultaneously. Uatu can convert his body into an unknown form of energy while still retaining his sentience for travel through hyperspace, and then return to his physical form. Bolstered by treatment with "delta-rays", Uatu possesses virtual immortality, although he can die by losing the will to live. He has shown he is able to transport himself and others through time, and in one issue he claims he can send someone to Limbo.

Watchers can augment their strength with cosmic psionic energy if they choose to; however, they tend to minimize their physical activities. The 1985 edition of the Official Handbook of the Marvel Universe compared Uatu's scale of power to that of Galactus, the Stranger, Odin, and Zeus.

Uatu received a highly extensive education in his youth on his home world. He has devoted himself to the study of Earth's solar system and its sentient beings for millions of years. His home on the Blue Area of the Moon contains an enormous array of weaponry, artifacts, and technology created by various alien races from throughout the universe.

Uatu also studies the Earths of alternate realities. With permission from the Timekeepers, he possesses a portal through which he can observe alternate realities. He has acquired extraordinary knowledge of the history of both the sentient beings on "mainstream" Earth and the numerous alternate Earths.

Other versions
In the alternate universe of the 1999 miniseries Earth X, Uatu is portrayed as a cold, nihilistic manipulator who feels no empathy for the people of Earth whom he watches. This is partially because he has been blinded by an Earthling, Black Bolt, and partially because the planet he is watching is nothing but the primal cocoon of an unborn Celestial, and the humans inhabiting it are mere "antibodies", a natural line of defense for constant menaces. Also, Uatu (who watches the events on Earth from a base on the Moon) is the original inspiration for the Egyptian moon god Khonshu.
The 2003 miniseries Marvel 1602 reveals that, although The Fantastic Four #13 was the first time he broke his oath, the anomalous appearance of Marvel's superheroes more than 300 years early — speculated by Uatu to be the result of the universe trying to create the means to save itself from a temporal anomaly — forced him to severely bend his oath by communicating with the 1602 version of Doctor Strange prior to the latter's death. Uatu's deal with Strange prevented Strange from telling anyone else about the danger facing the world while he lived while allowing him to communicate that knowledge with others after his physical body's demise. As a result, he must maintain a pocket universe containing the 1602 world within himself. The Overmind of the Watchers notes that, as much as they are ashamed of him, they are proud of him for saving the multiverse.
At the end of the main story in each issue of the 2008 miniseries Marvel Apes, a gorilla version of the Watcher can be seen telling stories from the past and trying to get around to a story of the "Marvel Apes Age". In issue #2, he becomes drunk after drinking an "Ultimate Nullifier", which he claims is like a martini, only mixed with "Kirby Dots". In his drunken state, he complains about how boring it is to watch everything all the time. He also reveals that he is infatuated with the ape version of the Wasp. In his drunken ranting, he goes so far as to ask the reader if they "wanna make out", then after realizing what he has said, apologizes and tries to explain himself. He usually tells stories that entertain him, such as the story of giant cowboy rat men and homosexual cowboy-apes, or the story of how Odin sentenced the Thorangutang to learn humility by becoming a doctor in the upbeat, rich city of Manhattan.
In the 2009 miniseries Marvel Zombies Return, a version of Uatu witnesses the Zombie Spider-Man's arrival in his universe. After being horrified by the nature of the infection, he decides to travel to other universes to warn others of the infection, but the zombie Giant-Man appears and bites off Uatu's head, planning to use his communicator to traverse the multiverse and satiate his hunger. At the end of the series, Uatu returns, stating he was pure energy, and thus could not be infected by the virus. With Giant-Man unable to master his technology before Spider-Man found a means of destroying most of the zombies, Uatu then proceeds to trap the last zombie, the Sentry, in a time-loop paradox by sending him back in time to Earth-2149, starting the entire Marvel Zombies Saga from the beginning and keeping the zombie infection contained in these two realities so that it will 'devour itself'. He eventually congratulated the Sandman for his help; Flint Marko had destroyed all the other mobile zombies by dispersing a nanite cure devised by Spider-Man.
In the alternate MC-2 Universe, Uatu made several appearances regarding its last two miniseries, Last Hero Standing and Last Planet Standing. In the former, he briefly related the history of the MC-Universe; in the latter, he died while standing in the way of Galactus and his herald.
In the reality seen in the 2004 miniseries Powerless, reality is turned upside down and is told from the point of view of psychiatrist William Watts, who in the very end is revealed to be the Powerless version of Uatu. Watts encounters non-powered versions of Spider-Man, Wolverine, and Daredevil, who face problems similar to their super-powered counterparts from Earth-616. Just as in Earth-616, Uatu finds that he cannot remain detached and watch as his patients' lives are ruined, and tries to come to their aid, but, like his original incarnation, he never acts directly, instead inspiring and guiding the heroes. He even watches the city using a telescope, before the last panel revelation that he is Uatu.
The Ultimate Marvel version of Uatu is not a person, but a highly advanced alien computer that observes everything. Ultimate Watcher resembles a stone totem of sorts with a glowing red eye. It is able to manifest in many locations at once. It has been observing Earth for some time and was present when Captain America received his powers. However, it appears that there is more than one Watcher in the Ultimate universe, for in Ultimate X-Men #96 Jean Grey attempts to find heaven to resurrect her father, only to be stopped by a Silver Surfer that is stationed in front of thousands of Watchers in a hive colony.
In the comics story Scarlet Traces: The Great Game, he is shown in a cave drawing on Mars as one of the original inhabitants of the Moon, along with the Selenites from The First Men in the Moon.

In other media

Television

 Uatu appeared in the 1967 Fantastic Four series, voiced by Paul Frees.
 Uatu appeared in "The Incredible Hulk" segment of The Marvel Super Heroes.
 Uatu made a cameo appearance in the X-Men episode "The Dark Phoenix Saga (Part 3): The Dark Phoenix".
 Uatu appears in the 1994 Fantastic Four series, voiced by Alan Oppenheimer.
 Uatu appears in Silver Surfer, voiced by Denis Akiyama in his first appearance and by Colin Fox in his second.
 Uatu appears in The Super Hero Squad Show, voiced by Dave Boat.
 Uatu appears in the Robot Chicken episode "Tapping a Hero", voiced by Tom Root.
 Uatu appears in Avengers Assemble, voiced by Clancy Brown.
 Uatu appears in the Hulk and the Agents of S.M.A.S.H. episode "The Trouble with Machines", voiced again by Clancy Brown.
 Jeffrey Wright voices the Watcher, a character based on Uatu, in the Marvel Cinematic Universe (MCU) series What If...?. This version serves as the series' narrator while observing alternate realities where major events in the MCU occur differently. He initially maintains his vow of non-interference until he accidentally reveals the multiverse's existence to an alternate universe version of Ultron empowered by the Infinity Stones and assembles the Guardians of the Multiverse to trap Ultron in a pocket dimension.

Video games
 Uatu appears in the What If...? mode of Spider-Man.
 Uatu appears in Marvel: Ultimate Alliance, voiced by Phil LaMarr.
 Uatu appears in the opening of Marvel Heroes, voiced by Vic Mignogna.
 Uatu appears in Super Hero Squad Online.
 Uatu serves as the narrator for Marvel Avengers: Battle for Earth, voiced by Steve Blum.

Books
Uatu appears at the conclusion of the X-Men/Star Trek crossover novel Planet X, written by Michael Jan Friedman, in which he speaks with Q regarding his role in the X-Men's recent trip to the Enterprise-E to assist the ship's crew with a crisis.

Webcomic
Uatu was parodied in the webcomic PvP, in which he comes to Earth to observe the trial of the lawsuit put forth by Marvel Comics against the creators of City of Heroes. After the judge declares a mistrial, Uatu shows the outcome of the case: Galactus devouring Earth.

Toys and collectibles
In 2004, Bowen Designs released a bust sculpture of Uatu sculpted and designed by the Kucharek Brothers. This is the first time a Watcher has been made into a sculpted dimensional product.

References

External links
Uatu the Watcher at Marvel.com
Uatu the Watcher at Marvel Appendix
1 of 2 comic strips featuring Uatu on pvponline.com 
2 of 2 comic strips featuring Uatu on pvponline.com 

Characters created by Jack Kirby
Characters created by Stan Lee
Comics characters introduced in 1963
Fictional characters with immortality
Fictional characters with superhuman senses
Marvel Comics aliens
Marvel Comics characters who have mental powers
Marvel Comics characters with superhuman strength
Marvel Comics telepaths